Reetz may refer to:

Gülitz-Reetz, municipality in Brandenburg, Germany
Recz, Poland
Reetz, a village in the municipality of Wiesenburg, Germany
Willy Reetz (1892–1963), German painter
Harold Reetz (born 1948), American agronomist
Jakson Reetz (born 1996), American baseball player